Pacocha District is one of three districts of the province Ilo in Peru.

References